The 2008 Vuelta a Burgos was the 30th edition of the Vuelta a Burgos road cycling stage race, which was held from 5 August to 9 August 2008. The race started and finished in Burgos. The race was won by Xabier Zandio of the  team.

General classification

References

Vuelta a Burgos
2008 in road cycling
2008 in Spanish sport